William Cawley (born c. 1628) was an English lawyer and politician who sat in the House of Commons in 1659 and 1660.

Cawley was the eldest son of William Cawley the regicide, and his first wife Catherine Walrond, daughter of William Walrond of Isle Brewers, Somerset. He entered Inner Temple in 1645 and was called to the bar in 1652. He was J.P. for Sussex from 1652 to July 1660 and was commissioner for assessment in 1652. In 1657 he was commissioner for assessment again. He was commissioner for militia in 1659. Also in 1659, Cawley was elected Member of Parliament for Chichester in the Third Protectorate Parliament. He was commissioner for assessment in January 1660. In April 1660 he was elected MP for Chichester in the Convention Parliament in a double return, but his election was declared void on 21 May. Cawley succeeded his father who had died in exile in 1667, but by 1700 was reduced to poverty and received a grant of £5 from the Inner Temple. 
 
Cawley married Elizabeth, the daughter of a sequestrated Cavalier by 1655.

References

1628 births
Year of death missing
Members of the Inner Temple
People from Chichester
Year of birth uncertain
English MPs 1659
English MPs 1660